The Talmudical Yeshiva of Philadelphia is a Haredi Litvish yeshiva in the Overbrook neighborhood of Philadelphia, Pennsylvania. Its heads of school are Rabbi Shmuel Kamenetsky, Rabbi Shimon Yehudah Svei and Rabbi Sholom Kaminetsky.

History
The yeshiva was founded in 1953 at the behest of Rabbi Aaron Kotler, the Rosh Yeshiva of Beth Medrash Govoha in Lakewood, New Jersey. Rabbis Shmuel Kamenetzky and Dov Schwartzman first headed the yeshiva. The yeshiva's first location was at Thirteenth and Berks Streets in the Strawberry Mansion neighborhood of Philadelphia.

The yeshiva purchased a building at 6040 Drexel Road in Overbrook in August 1955 and expanded its dormitories, eating facilities, classrooms, and library. In 1955, Rabbi Schwartzman left the yeshiva and was replaced by Rabbi Elya Svei. From 1965 until 1985, Rabbi Yisrael Mendel Kaplan was one of the yeshiva's senior lecturers.

School structure 
The yeshiva had 210 students in 1987 of which 110 were in grades 9 through 12.

The yeshiva currently consists of a high school of about 100 students in four grade levels and a beit midrash for the continuing education of college-aged students. Both the high school and beit midrash curriculums are weighted heavily towards Talmudic studies, although the high school provides its graduates with a fully accredited secular education. Most of the student body hails from outside the state, mainly from the New York City area, and virtually all students live in the dormitory near the main buildings.

The yeshiva provides its students with a strong background in Talmudic and Rabbinical studies. Many of its graduates choose to continue to other yeshivas and higher places of Jewish learning. Historically, a minority of students continue their studies in undergraduate and graduate schools across the United States.

Rav Avrohom Golombeck served as the institution's mashgiach until his passing in July 2008. Rav Yisroel Dick succeeded him in the position in March 2010.

References

External links
 

Haredi Judaism in the United States
Haredi yeshivas
Lithuanian-American culture in Pennsylvania
Lithuanian-Jewish culture in the United States
Orthodox yeshivas in the United States
Universities and colleges in Philadelphia
Educational institutions established in 1953
1953 establishments in Pennsylvania
Overbrook, Philadelphia
Jews and Judaism in Philadelphia